Bob D. Hamilton (born January 16, 1941) is an American former college basketball coach. He served as head coach for Wittenberg University and the NCAA Division I United States Naval Academy.

Hamilton was born in Glenford, Ohio and played basketball at Wittenberg for coaches Ray Mears and Eldon Miller. He was a member of the Tigers' 1961 national championship team. In 1968, Hamilton joined Miller's Wittenberg staff as an assistant and, two years later, succeeded him as head coach.

Hamilton spent six seasons as Tigers head coach, compiling a 119–38 record and winning four Ohio Athletic Conference (OAC) regular season and three OAC tournament titles. In the 1975–76 season, he led the team to the NCAA Division III championship game, losing to champion Scranton in overtime. At the conclusion of the season he was named the NABC Division III Coach of the Year.

Following the season, Hamilton was hired as head coach at Division I Navy. He spent four seasons as the Midshipmen coach, posting a winning record in each season and gaining a reputation for fiery behavior. His career record at Navy was 54–47. He retired from coaching after Navy declined to renew his contract in 1980.

References

External links
Division I coaching record
Ohio Basketball HOF profile

1941 births
Living people
American men's basketball coaches
American men's basketball players
Basketball coaches from Ohio
Basketball players from Ohio
College men's basketball head coaches in the United States
Navy Midshipmen men's basketball coaches
People from Perry County, Ohio
Wittenberg Tigers men's basketball coaches
Wittenberg Tigers men's basketball players